Oceania University of Medicine (OUM) is a Samoan-chartered medical school operated through a public-private partnership between the Government of Samoa and e-Medical Education, LLC, a Florida-based company. The OUM curriculum is divided into two phases: preclinical and clinical. OUM students are required to pass USMLE Step 1 or an international equivalent prior to advancing to clinical rotations. The preclinical phase is offered via distance learning while the clinical phases offers hands-on learning in a clinical settings at regional teaching hospitals. The medical school was founded in 2002 by philanthropist Taffy Gould, a handful of Australian doctors, and others to fill a void: a shortage of medical personnel in the South Pacific.

Due to Samoa's and the surrounding islands' remote location, an online curriculum with local physician mentors evolved. Aspiring physicians in other areas were experiencing similar barriers in pursuing a medical degree due to geographical isolation and/or personal commitments. Soon OUM began receiving applications from all over the world.

History 
Oceania University of Medicine (OUM) operates under a charter executed by the Government of Independent Samoa (formerly Western Samoa), as an autonomous statutory corporation operating in partnership with the Samoan government, represented by the prime minister. Its authority derives from the Oceania University of Medicine Act, passed by the Legislative Assembly of Samoa in January 2002. e-Medical Education, LLC, an international software and health science education company, operates OUM as part of the agreement. Housed on the grounds of the National Hospital Complex in Apia, the university formally opened in March 2002 with seven students. Less than a month after opening, its acting Dean, Professor Don Wilbur, returned to the United States, leaving only a single academic staff member in Samoa. In October 2002 five of the university's students complained that they were not getting the education they had paid for. In 2005 the university's Australian branch was criticised by an Australian Labor MP as offering "worthless" degrees.

In 2009 the university sought accreditation from the Philippine Accrediting Association of Schools, Colleges and Universities. Accreditation was granted in 2010 and renewed in 2011. In March 2011 Vice-Chancellor Professor Surindar Cheema and most of the staff were terminated by the university's American owner, without the knowledge of the university council.

In September 2012 the Samoan Government began discussions on a takeover of the university and merging it with the National University of Samoa. In January 2013 the Samoan Government began fully funding the university. In 2014 the university was nationalised and transferred to the NUS, becoming its School of Medicine. The university continues to graduate overseas students.

In 2019 the university moved into new teaching facilities at the Tupua Tamasese Motootua Hospital.

Governance
The university is governed by a council and a vice-chancellor and headed by a chancellor. The chancellor is appointed by the Council in consultation with the Prime Minister.

Four people have held the role of vice-chancellor, including:
 Professor Surindar Cheema (— 2011)
 Toleafoa Dr. Viali Lameko (2015 — 2021)
 Professor Randell Brown (2021 — 2021)
 Professor Hugh Bartholomeusz (2021 — )

Curriculum 
OUM offers only one degree: a Doctor of Medicine. This is offered by online teaching for 102 or 126 weeks (for students pursuing the United States Medical Licensing Examination), followed by 72 weeks of clinical rotation at teaching hospitals. Both pathways include a mandatory 4-week clinical rotation in Samoa.

OUM's programs operate on a rolling admissions schedule that allows new students to enroll in January or July.

Faculty 
The OUM faculty reflects the diversity of the student body. Faculty from Australia, New Zealand, and the United States work collaboratively to deliver a common internationally applicable medical curriculum based largely on American and Australian medical education standards. There is considerable focus on the licensing standards and requirements for the countries where graduates intend to practice.

All faculty have earned MBBS, MD, PhD, and other terminal degrees in their fields. Faculty members teach classes and serve as academic advisors.

Student demographics 
60% of the student body are from Australia or New Zealand. OUM has students come from over 50 nationality backgrounds. 42% hold master's degrees and 8% hold doctorates. Nurses, nurse practitioners and physician assistants are the most common professions stated on enrolment.

References

External links
OUM website
OUM Catalogue 2020-21

Universities and colleges in Samoa
Buildings and structures in Apia
Educational institutions established in 2002
2002 establishments in Samoa